Zion Tupuola-Fetui (born July 3, 2000) is an American football linebacker for the Washington Huskies.

Early years
Tupuola-Fetui attended Pearl City High School in Pearl City, Hawai'i. He played defensive line and tight end in high school. He committed to the University of Washington to play college football. Tupuola-Fetui also played volleyball in high school.

College career
Tupuola-Fetui played two games his first year at Washington in 2018 and took a redshirt. As a redshirt freshman in 2019, he played in 12 games and had nine tackles. As a redshirt sophomore in 2020, he became a starter. Through the first three games of the season, he recorded seven sacks.

References

External links
Washington Huskies bio

Living people
Players of American football from Hawaii
American football linebackers
Washington Huskies football players
2000 births